Salinas v. Railroad Retirement Board, 592 U.S. ___ (2021), was a United States Supreme Court case in which the court held that the United States Railroad Retirement Board choice to refuse to reopen the prior, adverse benefits determination of a former railroad worker was subject to judicial review.

Facts and procedural history
Manfredo M. Salinas was an employee of the Union Pacific Railroad for a fifteen-year period and was injured twice while working. In 1992, due to his injuries, Salinas began the process of seeking disability benefits provided under the Railroad Retirement Act of 1974. His application was denied three times, the final denial occurring in 2006. Salinas was granted benefits after a fourth application in 2013. After the board granted Salinas benefits, he appealed for reconsideration of the "amount and start date" of the benefits. 

This reconsideration was denied. In response, Salinas appealed, arguing that the final denied application should be reopened, as the Railroad Retirement Board had not been given access to pertinent medical records in 2006. A Board hearing officer determined that the 2006 application could not be reopened as the Board’s standard four-year window for reopening had closed. After this determination, Salinas asked the U.S. Court of Appeals to review the decision. The Fifth Circuit dismissed Salinas’ petition, citing lack of jurisdiction.

Supreme Court
In a 5–4 ruling, The Supreme Court reversed the Fifth Circuit's decision. The Supreme Court held that the Board's choice not to reopen the prior benefits review was subject to judicial review.

References

External links 
 

2021 in United States case law
United States Supreme Court cases of the Roberts Court
United States Supreme Court cases